Platichthys is a genus of flatfish native to the North Pacific and North Atlantic oceans. Despite being in the family Pleuronectidae (popularly known as righteye flounders), all three species in the genus Platichthys are often "lefteyed", i.e. they lie on the sea bottom on their right side, with both eyes on the left side.

Species
There are currently three recognized species in this genus:

References

Further reading
 Momigliano, M.; G.P.J. Denys; H. Jokinen; and J. Merilä (2018). Platichthys solemdali sp. nov. (Actinopterygii, Pleuronectiformes): A New Flounder Species From the Baltic Sea. Front. Mar. Sci. 5(225). 

 
Pleuronectidae